José Antonio Cabello Gil (born 21 July 1964) is a Mexican politician affiliated with the National Action Party. As of 2014 he served as Deputy of the LIX Legislature of the Mexican Congress as a plurinominal representative.

References

1964 births
Living people
Politicians from Monterrey
Members of the Chamber of Deputies (Mexico)
National Action Party (Mexico) politicians
Members of the Congress of Jalisco
21st-century Mexican politicians
Deputies of the LIX Legislature of Mexico